Creedmoor is a city in Granville County, North Carolina, United States. The population was 4,124 at the 2010 census.

History
In 1885, a group of 25 taxpayers of Granville County, including Civil War Confederate veteran Robert Fleming, appeared before the Board of Commissioners for the County of Granville with a petition from the Dutchville Township. The petition made a proposition to subscribe ten thousand dollars to the capital stock of the Oxford and Clarksville Railroad Company. Under the provisions of the act of the General Assembly of North Carolina which was entitled "An Act to Incorporate", the Oxford and Clarksville Railroad Company was notified on 28 February 1885. The proposal was thereby approved under the provisions of the General Assembly of North Carolina. As a result, it was ordered that the election of subscribing the said sum of ten thousand dollars to the capital stock of the said railroad company be submitted to the qualified voters of the Dutchville Township and that an election be held in the said township at the proper voting place therein on 8 October 1887.
 
Over the next few years, Creedmoor served as a railroad depot between the Clarksville and Oxford Railroad and the Raleigh and Gaston Railroad. In 1886, Thomas B. Lyon applied to the Postal Department for a post office to be located in Creedmoor. Lyon's request was granted on 10 April 1886. John Harmon was appointed as the first postmaster. In September of that same year, Samuel C. Lyon, son of Thomas B. Lyon, was appointed postmaster.

In 1888 Lyon sold part of his land to the Durham and Northern Railroad for track to run through the town. Linking Creedmoor to Henderson and Durham was a major cause of growth of this town. The old Seaboard train depot building still stands at its location on Elm Street, making it over 120 years old.  Also previously located on Elm Street was the original First Baptist Church of Creedmoor, built in 1895. The present church building from 1950 stands on Main Street. Lyon's body is entombed on the grounds of the original cemetery for the church, whereas Robert Fleming's body is entombed in a small family plot on Fleming Street, a road named for the founder, adjacent to Elm Street.

Creedmoor was incorporated in 1905, having previously been known as "Creedmore". The first mayor was Joseph L. Peed (1859–1936).  The street Joe Peed Road located on southbound US-15 leaving the city is named in his honor.  The first Commissioners were J.F. Sanderford, Isaac Bullock, S.C. Lyon, and Claude Garner.  In 1917, electricity came to Creedmoor when G. H. Dove and F. J. McDuffy flipped a switch in their plant on Railroad Street.

Although the town is rich with history (home to four buildings on the National Register of Historic Places), it does not hold the title of a Historic District unlike nearby Oxford and Wake Forest.

Impact of tobacco
Tobacco was extremely important in the early history of the town. Four tobacco warehouses were built in the town in the early 1900s. Tobacco was a cash crop in Creedmoor, and was shipped by railroad to nearby Oxford's Tobacco Research Facility and Durham's thriving smoking tobacco industry, with firms including W. T. Blackwell and Company, American Tobacco Company, and Liggett & Myers. At one time Creedmoor was a larger tobacco market than Durham. Area farmers did not limit themselves to tobacco only, but also grew cotton, a profitable crop.

The mule trade
In the wake of the tobacco era, mules came to Creedmoor. About forty train car loads of mules were pulled into the town each year. Mules were the ideal farm animals because their hooves were smaller than those of a horse. Their smaller feet helped them pass through rows of tobacco without stepping on the crop. In 1906, Jim Netherly and a Mr. Cooper founded the Creedmoor Supply Company, which sold feed, mules, horses, buggies, and even some groceries and seeds to meet the demands of local farmers. G.M. Chappell opened a barn that auctioned mules, horses, and cows from 1938 to 1962. At one point in time, Creedmoor was considered to be the largest mule trading center in the world and was widely referred to as "Mule Town". By 1940, over $500,000 were traded and spent on mules each year. It was not until the mid-1950s that the town removed the slogan "One of the Largest Retail Livestock Markets in North Carolina" from the official letterhead. By then, the mule trade was no longer a major part of the local economy.

Historic places

Creedmoor is home to four buildings listed on the National Register of Historic Places: 
Cannady-Brogden Farm south of Creedmoor in Wake County
James Mangum House
First National Bank Building
Obediah Winston Farm

Education
Creedmoor High School opened in 1909 at the intersection of Main Street and Highway 56. Joel Anderson Pitts (1877–1958), a graduate of Duke University – then called Trinity College – was the first principal. This school served grades one through twelve until 1963, when white students went to South Granville High School. On January 9, 1970, Creedmoor School, at that time serving grades one through eight, burned down. Behind the former Creedmoor High School gym lies B.C. Roberts Ballfield, named after Battle Caviness Roberts who coached for the South Granville Athletic Association well into his years before his death in 1982.

Creedmoor is also the home of South Granville High School, G.C. Hawley Middle, and Creedmoor Elementary. The Hawley School, dedicated in 1937 for educationalist Rev. Grover Cleveland Hawley, originally educated the local black students. The opening of the school was bolstered by the support of Dr. R.G. Rogers, Creedmoor town physician and dentist who was a member of the Granville County Board of Education at that time. His support was instrumental on the board. The doors to Hawley School first opened for all local black students in September 1952 after many years of tireless and dedicated work spearheaded by Reverend Hawley. The new facility housed grades seven through twelve. In 1975, Hawley became a middle school serving grades five through eight from the Butner, Stem, and Creedmoor areas and eighth graders from Wilton. In September 1986, seventh graders from Wilton Elementary were moved to Hawley, and in 1987 sixth graders from Wilton also began to attend Hawley. At the present time, Hawley Middle School teaches grades six through eight from the Creedmoor and Wilton area. Students from Butner and Stem now attend Butner-Stem Middle School.

Other notable places 
 The Dr. Joseph Thompson house at 213 S. Main Street belonged to the town's first medical doctor and had an office in his home to the right of the building on the main floor. There is a porte-cochère that extends off that side as well. The home is an early Craftsman period structure with a wrap-around porch. It was built in 1910 on land purchased from the Lyon family. Dr. Thompson was a native of Leasburg in Caswell County. He attended the University of North Carolina as an undergraduate before going to the University of Louisville School of Medicine for his medical degree. He moved to Creedmoor about 1908. He married Mayme Lunsford in 1910 and moved her to their home on Main Street (at that time, a four-room, one-story cottage). He practiced medicine in northern Wake and southern Granville County until 1957 and died at home in August 1958.
 The Cedar Creek Gallery was built in 1968 on what used to be an old tobacco field in the community of Northside. The gallery has grown from one building to over ten.
 Creedmoor Cemetery, located beside Creedmoor Elementary on Highway 56, is the final resting place of many prominent figures from the early days of Creedmoor. Entombed are the families of Rogers, Chappell, Lyon, Peed, Mangum, Bragg, Mitchell, Roberts, Wheeler, Aiken, and many others.

Media
Like most towns, Creedmoor has a variety of media. Some of the more notable are listed below.

Newspapers
The Butner-Creedmoor News - The local newspaper company was established in 1965 within the former USO building on Creedmoor's Main Street.

Other newspapers distributed throughout the city are:
The Herald-Sun, from Durham
The News & Observer, from Raleigh
The Oxford Ledger
The Franklin Times

Radio stations
WCMC-FM 99.9 FM - The Fan - Sports
W256AH 99.1 FM (WRTP) - Christian Contemporary
WDRU 1030 AM - Religious

Local TV stations
WTVD - ABC - Durham/ Raleigh, NC
WRAL-TV - NBC - Raleigh, NC
WRAZ (TV) - Fox - Raleigh/ Durham/ Fayetteville, NC
WNCN - CBS - Raleigh/ Durham/ Goldsboro, NC
WLFL - The CW - Raleigh/ Durham/ Fayetteville, NC
WRDC - MyNetworkTV - Raleigh/ Durham/ Fayetteville, NC
WUNC-TV PBS - Chapel Hill

Geography
Creedmoor is located in southern Granville County at  (36.123081, -78.683252). It is bordered to the west by the town of Butner.

U.S. Route 15 passes through Creedmoor as Durham Avenue, leading north  to Oxford, the Granville County seat, and southwest  to Durham. North Carolina Highway 56 crosses US 15 just west of the center of town. Interstate 85 leads southwest to Durham and northeast  to Petersburg, Virginia.

Lake Rogers, a  lake that offers picnicking, fishing, playground and boating accommodations, is in the northwest part of the city. Creedmoor is within the Neuse River watershed.

Demographics

2020 census

As of the 2020 United States census, there were 4,866 people, 1,669 households, and 1,291 families residing in the city.

2010 census
As of the census of 2010, there were 4,124 people in 1,550 households residing in the city. The population density was 1330.3 people per square mile (515.5/km2). There were 1,728 housing units at an average density of 557.4 per square mile (216.0/km2). The racial makeup of the city was 59.5% White, 35.2% African American, 0.6% Native American, 0.8% Asian, 1.7% from other races, and 2.1% from two or more races. Hispanic or Latino of any race were 5.0% of the population.

There were 1,550 households, out of which 37.2% had children under the age of 18 living with them. The average household size was 2.66.  In the city, the population was spread out, with 27.3% under the age of 18, 6.5% from 18 to 24, 13.5% from 25 to 34, 25.9% from 35 to 49, 16.3% from 50 to 64, and 10.5% who were 65 years of age or older. For every 100 females, there were 91.8 males.

The median income for a household in the city was $60,417, and the mean income for a household was $66,187.  The median and mean family income was $68,109 and $71,772, respectively. The per capita income for the city was $23,697. About 10.5% of families and 13.1% of the population were below the poverty line, including 15.8% of those under age 18 and 20.9% of those age 65 or over.

Schools 
 Creedmoor Elementary School of the Arts
 Mount Energy Elementary 
 G.C. Hawley Middle School 
 South Granville High School of Integrated Technology and Leadership
 South Granville  High School of Health and Life Sciences 
 Granville Early College High School

Government
The Mayor of the City of Creedmoor is Bobby Wheeler.

The Creedmoor City Commissioners are:

 Emma Albright
 Ed Gleason
 Georgana Kicinski
 Robert Way
 Archer Wilkins

 Michael Turner, City Manager

References

External links
 City of Creedmoor official website
 Butner-Creedmoor News

Cities in North Carolina
Cities in Granville County, North Carolina